The United States Penitentiary, Lewisburg (USP Lewisburg) is a medium-security United States federal prison in Pennsylvania for male inmates. It is operated by the Federal Bureau of Prisons, a division of the United States Department of Justice. An adjacent satellite prison camp houses minimum-security male offenders.

USP Lewisburg is in Kelly Township, Pennsylvania, near Lewisburg.

History
Initially named North Eastern Penitentiary, USP Lewisburg was one of four federal prisons to open in 1932. It was designed by Alfred Hopkins.

USP Lewisburg had a prison riot in November 1995. Although started by only 10 prisoners, more than 20 visited the hospital that November 1, with one prisoner recording multiple broken bones and missing teeth. Many were sentenced to the "hole" and over 400 were transferred. This incident thrust the Penitentiary into the national spotlight, where it gained much of its current notoriety.

A local non-profit group, the Lewisburg Prison Project, assists prisoners here and in the surrounding area with issues of conditions of confinement.

USP Lewisburg was the focus of the 1991 Academy Award-nominated documentary Doing Time: Life Inside the Big House by filmmakers Alan and Susan Raymond. The one hour long film described conditions inside the prison and focused specifically on the abolition of parole within the federal system and the fears held by many prisoners about re-integrating into society upon their eventual release from prison.

As of 2009, USP Lewisburg was designated as a Special Management Unit intended to house the most violent and disruptive inmates in the Bureau of Prisons.  Although most USP Lewisburg inmates are housed in the SMU, there remains a work cadre of approximately 200 inmates in the USP's general population.

As of February 2021, USP Lewisburg was officially moved from a high-security institution to medium security. It will now be the third location within the BOP for Communications management units (CMU), alongside USP Marion and FCI Terre Haute. Offenders in the CMU will mostly be terrorists and inmates the BOP classifies as security threats who will be held in solitary confinement for 23 hours a day. The Special Management Unit (SMU) that was operated at Lewisburg is now at USP Thomson, which opened in 2019.

Funding issues

In July 2008, correction officers at USP Lewisburg expressed concerns about underfunding. Over the past four years, union leaders and other officials had been lobbying in an attempt to quell staff reductions and cutting costs. The Federal Bureau of Prisons had proposed $143 million in possible spending cuts, including not replacing vehicles and equipment, eliminating overtime, reducing corrections officer training, and a possible cut in officer staff positions. Under such conditions, many of the Correctional Officers expressed concerns about their own safety.

Notable inmates (current and former)
†Inmates released prior to 1982 are not listed on the Federal Bureau of Prisons website.          
††Inmates in the Federal Witness Protection Program are not listed on the Federal Bureau of Prisons website.

Organized crime figures

Terrorists

Political prisoners

Others

See also

List of U.S. federal prisons
Federal Bureau of Prisons
Incarceration in the United States

References 

Prisons in Pennsylvania
Buildings and structures in Union County, Pennsylvania
Lewisburg
1932 establishments in Pennsylvania